The 2018 Minnesota United FC season was the ninth season of Minnesota United FC's existence and their second season in Major League Soccer, the top-tier of American soccer. United played at TCF Bank Stadium and was coached by Adrian Heath, who still coaches United. Outside of MLS, Minnesota United also participated in the 2018 U.S. Open Cup, as well as various preseason competitions.

Club

Transfers

Transfers In

MLS Re-Entry Draft 

Stage 1 of the Re-Entry Draft took place on December 15, 2017.
Stage 2 of the Re-Entry Draft took place on December 21, 2017.

MLS SuperDraft 

Any player marked with a * is part of the Generation Adidas program.

Transfers Out

Loans In

Loans Out

Friendlies

Carolina Challenge Cup

Competitions

Overview

{| class="wikitable" style="text-align: center"
|-
!rowspan=2|Competition
!colspan=8|Record
|-
!
!
!
!
!
!
!
!
|-
| MLS

|-
| U.S. Open Cup

|-
! Total

MLS

Overall table

Results summary

Results by round

Matches

U.S. Open Cup

Player statistics

Top scorers

Shutouts

Appearances

Discipline

Attendance

References 

2018
2018 Major League Soccer season
American soccer clubs 2018 season
2018 in sports in Minnesota